The 1907–08 Butler Bulldogs men's basketball team represents Butler University during the 1907–08 college men's basketball season. The head coach was John McKay, coaching in his first season with the Bulldogs.

Schedule

|-

References

Butler Bulldogs men's basketball seasons
Butler
Butl
Butl